House at 461 Spruce Lake Road is a historic home located in Summit, Schoharie County, New York.  It was built about 1850, and is a two-story, double pile, front-gable form vernacular Greek Revival style dwelling with a one-story, single pile, side wing.  The main block and most of side wing is board-wall construction consisting of horizontally-stacked hemlock planks.  The front facade features corner pilasters and a moulded projecting cornice.

It was listed on the National Register of Historic Places in 2015.

References

Houses on the National Register of Historic Places in New York (state)
Greek Revival houses in New York (state)
Houses completed in 1850
Buildings and structures in Schoharie County, New York
National Register of Historic Places in Schoharie County, New York